Nathan Colin Leslie Smith (born 11 January 1987) is a professional footballer who plays as a left-back or centre-back for Isthmian League North Division side Hashtag United. Born in England, he represented Jamaica internationally.

He started his career with part-time London clubs Enfield, Waltham Forest and Potters Bar Town. During his time at these clubs he also worked as a computer analyst before being discovered by League One side Yeovil Town.

Club career

Early career
Smith started his football career at Enfield joining as a teenager and making 22 appearances, he then had a brief spell at Waltham Forest before signing for Isthmian League side Potters Bar Town. His then manager Steve Browne, an ex-Yeovil player, recommended him along with four others to his former club Yeovil Town.

Yeovil Town
Smith went on trial in January 2008 with the club appearing in five games before agreeing non-contract terms on 23 March to enable him to make his début the next day away at Hartlepool United as a 61st-minute substitute. He then signed a permanent two-year professional deal with the club, dropping out of his IT job, he then proceeded to start every game until the end of the season. He scored his first professional goal on 13 December 2008 with a shot from 30 yards in the 4–2 defeat to Stockport County. Smith was offered a new contract at Yeovil but it was stated that Reading, Sheffield United and Ipswich Town were all interested in his services, but despite this, he signed a new contract with Yeovil. He was informed by the club at the end of the 2010/11 season that he was one of seven Yeovil players who would be awarded new contracts.

Chesterfield
After rejecting this new contract offer, Smith left Yeovil after 119 appearances and moved to newly promoted side Chesterfield signing a two-year contract. Unfortunately, in his first season with the club Smith experienced relegation to Football League Two, during that season he was used primarily as a squad player. In 2012–2013 he experienced his best season at the Proact Stadium, becoming a regular until a broken foot halted his season in March 2013. Despite that Smith was named Player of the Year by both supporters and players. An injury-hit campaign and the arrival of Ritchie Humphreys meant that Smith only started 12 League games in Chesterfield's League 2 Championship season.

Yeovil Town
Smith decided at the end of the season to move back to Yeovil Town on a two-year deal starting on 1 July 2014. On 30 April 2016, he scored his second goal for the club in a 4–3 victory against Barnet. He was released by Yeovil at the end of the 2017–18 season.

Dagenham & Redbridge
On 25 October 2018, Smith signed for National League side Dagenham & Redbridge on a deal until the end of the season. In May 2019, it was announced that he would be released following the expiration of his contract at the end of the 2018–19 campaign.

Hashtag United FC 
On 4 March 2023, Nathan Smith signed for Isthmian League side Hashtag United F.C. and scored two goals on debut against Tilbury F.C. in an 8-1 victory.

International career
Smith made his international début for the Jamaica against Honduras on 12 October 2011. He has won one further cap against Guyana in May 2012, both games were friendlies.

Career statistics

Club

International

Honours
Chesterfield
Football League Two: 2013–14
EFL Trophy: 2011–12

References

External links
 
 

1987 births
Living people
Footballers from Enfield, London
English footballers
English people of Jamaican descent
Jamaican footballers
Jamaica international footballers
Association football fullbacks
English Football League players
National League (English football) players
Isthmian League players
Enfield F.C. players
Potters Bar Town F.C. players
Yeovil Town F.C. players
Chesterfield F.C. players
Dagenham & Redbridge F.C. players
Dulwich Hamlet F.C. players
Braintree Town F.C. players
Enfield Town F.C. players
Concord Rangers F.C. players
Hashtag United F.C. players